The  was a class of two support ships of the Imperial Japanese Navy (IJN), serving during World War II.

Construction
In 1940, the IJN planned two support ship classes to help their aircraft carriers. One was the 4,500-ton , the other one the 8,000 ton Ashizuri class.  The Ashizuri was planned to support for two large-sized carriers (and ) in the battlefield. The thought is the same as USS Sacramento.

Service
Not joining the IJN till mid-1943 when the Japanese navy was well and truly on the back foot, the ships participated in convoy duties delivering fuel oil around Southeast Asia. Their top speed of 16 knots meant that they would not have been capable of keeping up with the fast carrier battle groups.

Ships in class

References
, History of Pacific War Vol.62 "Ships of The Imperial Japanese Forces, Gakken (Japan), January 2008, 
Ships of the World special issue Vol.47, Auxiliary Vessels of the Imperial Japanese Navy, (Japan), March 1997

World War II naval ships of Japan
Auxiliary ships of the Imperial Japanese Navy
World War II tankers
Ships built by Mitsubishi Heavy Industries
Auxiliary replenishment ship classes